Harry Julian Fink (July 7, 1923 – August 8, 2001) was an American television and film writer known for Have Gun – Will Travel and as one of the writers who created Dirty Harry.

Fink wrote for various television shows in the 1950s and 1960s, and also created several, including NBC's T.H.E. Cat, starring Robert Loggia, and Tate starring David McLean.

His first film work was the 1965 Sam Peckinpah film Major Dundee. He also worked on Ice Station Zebra, and, with his wife R. M. Fink, Big Jake, Dirty Harry and Cahill U.S. Marshal.

References

External links

American male screenwriters
American television writers
2001 deaths
1923 births
American male television writers
20th-century American male writers
20th-century American screenwriters